The Code of Life is the third album by American heavy metal band Warrior. It is the first and only album to feature vocalist Rob Rock.

Track listing 
"Day of Reckoning" – 04:03
"Kill the Machine" – 04:29
"Standing" – 04:47
"We Are One" – 06:33
"Open Your Eyes" – 06:13
"Pantheon" – 01:50
"The Code of Life" – 04:37
"Soul Survivor" – 04:02
"The Endless Beginning" – 05:35
"The Fools' Theme" – 04:41
"Insignificance" – 01:29
"Retribution" – 04:17

Personnel 
Rob Rock – vocals
Joe Floyd – guitars
Mick Perez – guitars
Simon Oliver – bass
Dave DuCey – drums
Richard Carrette – lead guitar on "The Endless Beginning"

2001 albums